, also called Alien Defender Geo-Armor: Kishin Corps, is a series of Japanese light novels written and illustrated by Masaki Yamada. The series was published in 10 volumes between 1990 and 1994. It is a work of alternate history, taking place in 1941 during World War II. An alien race invades the earth and their forces ally themselves with the Axis powers. To combat these aliens an elite allied unit called the Kishin Corps is created, using alien technology. The story deals with the main character Taishi, who obtains a secret alien device from his father, which the Germans are after to build their own robots.

In 1995, Kishin Corps won the Seiun Award for "Best Japanese Novel of the Year". An original video animation titled Alien Defender Geo-Armor: Kishin Corps was produced by Geneon, co-directed by Takaaki Ishiyama and Kazunori Mizuno, and released in Japan between March 24, 1993, and August 25, 1994.

See also
 Worldwar series

References

External links
 

1990 Japanese novels
1993 anime OVAs
Action anime and manga
Alternate history anime
Anime and manga based on light novels
Chuokoron-Shinsha books
Geneon USA
Light novels
Mecha anime and manga
NBCUniversal Entertainment Japan
Shōnen manga
Tokuma Shoten manga
World War II alternate histories